Karen Margrethe Kuvaas (born June 14, 1947) is a Norwegian politician for the Norwegian Labour Party and since 2007 mayor of Narvik.

Kuvaas took over as mayor succeeding her party colleague Olav Sigurd Alstad following the 2007 election. In November she was one of the four Nordland mayors who fronted the municipalities case in the Terra Securities scandal.

References 

Mayors of places in Nordland
Labour Party (Norway) politicians
Living people
1947 births
Women mayors of places in Norway
Place of birth missing (living people)
20th-century Norwegian women politicians
20th-century Norwegian politicians